Events from the year 1928 in Canada.

Incumbents

Crown 
 Monarch – George V

Federal government 
 Governor General – Freeman Freeman-Thomas, 1st Marquess of Willingdon 
 Prime Minister – William Lyon Mackenzie King
 Chief Justice – Francis Alexander Anglin (Ontario)
 Parliament – 16th

Provincial governments

Lieutenant governors 
Lieutenant Governor of Alberta – William Egbert 
Lieutenant Governor of British Columbia – Robert Randolph Bruce 
Lieutenant Governor of Manitoba – Theodore Arthur Burrows  
Lieutenant Governor of New Brunswick – William Frederick Todd (until December 28) then Hugh Havelock McLean 
Lieutenant Governor of Nova Scotia – James Cranswick Tory
Lieutenant Governor of Ontario – William Donald Ross 
Lieutenant Governor of Prince Edward Island – Frank Richard Heartz 
Lieutenant Governor of Quebec – Narcisse Pérodeau (until December 31) then Lomer Gouin 
Lieutenant Governor of Saskatchewan – Henry William Newlands

Premiers 
Premier of Alberta – John Edward Brownlee   
Premier of British Columbia – John Duncan MacLean (until August 21) then Simon Fraser Tolmie
Premier of Manitoba – John Bracken 
Premier of New Brunswick – John Baxter 
Premier of Nova Scotia – Edgar Nelson Rhodes 
Premier of Ontario – George Howard Ferguson 
Premier of Prince Edward Island – Albert Charles Saunders 
Premier of Quebec – Louis-Alexandre Taschereau 
Premier of Saskatchewan – James Garfield Gardiner

Territorial governments

Commissioners 
 Gold Commissioner of Yukon – George A. Jeckell (until April 1) then George Ian MacLean 
 Commissioner of Northwest Territories – William Wallace Cory

Events
April 2 – Camillien Houde elected mayor of Montreal
April 24 – The Supreme Court of Canada rules that women are not persons who can hold office according to the British North America Act, 1867—reversed a year later by the Judicial Committee of the Privy Council in Britain
May 7 – The St. Roch is launched. It would become the first ship to sail the Northwest Passage from west to east and to circumnavigate North America.
May 31 – The Legislative Council of Nova Scotia is abolished
July 4 – Jean Lussier goes over Niagara Falls in a rubber ball.
August 20 – John Duncan MacLean resigns as premier of British Columbia
August 21 – Simon Fraser Tolmie becomes premier of British Columbia, replacing John Duncan MacLean
August 25 – Canada's first major air disaster occurred when bad weather caused a BC Airways Ford Trimotor plane to crash in Puget Sound, Washington

Science and technology
Frank Morse Robb of Ontario obtains a patent for the first Electronic Organ, the Robb Wave Organ.

Sports
The Winter Olympics take place in St. Moritz, Switzerland. The University of Toronto Grads won a gold medal in ice hockey.
The Summer Olympics take place in Amsterdam. Percy Williams and Ethel Catherwood won gold medals for Canada.
March 26 – The South Saskatchewan Junior Hockey League's Regina Pats win their second Memorial Cup by defeating the Ottawa City Junior Hockey League's Ottawa Gunners 2 game to 1. The deciding Game 3 was played Arenas Garden in Toronto
December 1 – The Hamilton Tigers win their third Grey cup by shutting out the Regina Roughriders 30 to 0 in the 16th Grey Cup played at A.A.A Grounds in Hamilton

Births

January to March

January 2
Avie Bennett, businessman and philanthropist (d. 2017)
Allen Sapp, painter (d. 2015)
January 7 – Benny Woit, ice hockey player (d. 2016)
January 20 – Peter Donat, actor (d. 2018)
January 25 – Jérôme Choquette, lawyer and politician (d. 2017)
February 8 – Gene Lees, biographer and lyricist (d. 2010)
February 13 – Gerald Regan, politician, Minister and Premier of Nova Scotia (d. 2019)
February 16 – Les Costello, ice hockey player and Catholic priest (d. 2002)
February 26 – Donald Davis, actor (d. 1998)
March 3 – Diane Foster, athlete (d. 1999)
March 9 – Gerald Bull, engineer and artillery designer (d. 1990)
March 10 – Robert Coates, politician and minister (d. 2016)
March 12 – Thérèse Lavoie-Roux, politician and Senator (d. 2009)
March 13 – Douglas Rain, actor and narrator (d. 2018)
March 17 
 André Chagnon, businessman and philanthropist (d. 2022)
 William John McKeag, politician and Lieutenant-Governor of Manitoba (d. 2007)
March 31 – Gordie Howe, ice hockey player (d. 2016)

April to June
April 10 
Kenneth Earl Hurlburt, politician (d. 2016)
Fraser MacPherson, jazz musician (d. 1993)
April 17 – Fabien Roy, politician
April 28 – Zbigniew Basinski, physicist
April 30 – Hugh Hood, novelist, short story writer, essayist and university professor (d. 2000)
May 4 – Maynard Ferguson, jazz trumpet player and bandleader (d. 2006)
May 7 – Bruno Gerussi, actor and television presenter (d. 1995)
May 9 – Barbara Ann Scott, figure skater and Olympic gold medalist (d. 2012)
May 23
Pauline Julien, singer, songwriter, actress and feminist activist (d. 1998)
Sidney Spivak, politician and Minister (d. 2002)
June 1 – Larry Zeidel, Canadian-American ice hockey player and sportscaster (d. 2014)
June 2 – George Wearring, basketball player (d. 2013)
June 13 – Renée Morisset, pianist (d. 2009)
June 25 – Michel Brault, cinematographer, cameraman, film director, screenwriter and producer (d. 2013)
June 26 – Samuel Belzberg, businessman, philanthropist (d. 2018)

July to December
July 3 – Raymond Setlakwe, entrepreneur, lawyer and politician (d. 2021)
July 7 – Tom Chambers, politician (d. 2018)
July 12 – Paul Ronty, ice hockey centre (d. 2020)
July 17 – Robert Nixon, politician
July 21 – Anne Harris, sculptor
July 22 – Hugh Edighoffer, politician (d. 2019)
July 23 – Irving Grundman, ice hockey executive and politician (d. 2021)
July 26 – Peter Lougheed, lawyer and politician (d. 2012)
July 28 – Ann Sloat, politician (d. 2017)
July 31 – Gilles Carle, film director and screenwriter (d. 2009)
August 7 – James Randi, stage magician and scientific skeptic (d. 2020 in the United States)
September 10
Roch Bolduc, civil servant, politician 
Jean Vanier, founder of L'Arche (d. 2019)
September 20 – Jacqueline Desmarais, billionaire philanthropist (d. 2018)
October 1 – Jim Pattison, businessman
October 7 – Raymond Lévesque, singer-songwriter (d. 2021)
October 9 – Clare Drake, ice hockey coach (d. 2018)
October 27 – Gilles Vigneault, poet, publisher and singer-songwriter
November 3 – Gary Lautens, humorist and newspaper columnist (d. 1992)
November 16 – David Adams, ballet dancer (d. 2007)
November 20 – Toni Onley, painter (d. 2004)
November 28 – Floyd Crawford, ice hockey player (d. 2017)
December 10 – Michael Snow, artist
December 12 – Lionel Blair, dancer and entertainer (d. 2021 in the United Kingdom)
December 16 – Roy Bailey, politician (d. 2018)
December 21 – Clayton Kenny, boxer (d. 2015)
December 28 – Moe Koffman, flautist and saxophonist (d. 2001)
December 29
Robert Hylton Brisco, politician (d. 2004)
Norman Cafik, politician (d. 2016)

Full date unknown
Peter Bronfman, businessman (d. 1996)

Deaths
April 6 – Godfroy Langlois, politician, journalist and lawyer (b. 1866)
April 28 – George Gerald King, politician (b. 1836)

See also
 List of Canadian films

Historical documents
Supreme Court's negative decision on whether women can be appointed to Senate

Emily Murphy leads Famous Five in response to Supreme Court decision against women entering Senate

Influenza epidemic among Northwest Territories Indigenous people "spread[s] like wildfire" from Mackenzie delta to northern Alberta

MP Agnes Macphail calls for federal department of peace because people lack "confidence in war or in preparedness for war"

Guide to social hygiene combines public health and eugenics

Manitoba MLA explains trials of unemployment for single men and new immigrants, especially after crop failure in her province

Statements and petition from Quebec call on government to give settling "sons of our large families" priority over immigrants

M.J. Coldwell would prioritize settling "those who through[...]damage to crops and mortgage companies had gone to the wall"

Anglican bishop of Saskatchewan calls immigration "the foreignization of Canada [with the] aggression of the Church of Rome"

Backing "Protestantism, Racial Purity, Gentile Economic Freedom" etc., KKK constitution adopted by Imperial Kloncilium in Regina

Film clip: Brief segment of film on Coast Salish people shows Skwxwú7mesh (Squamish) master weaver Skwetsiya (Mrs. Harriet Johnnie) making hat

Photographer Ansel Adams and other Sierra Club members' first experience of Canadian Rockies

References

 
Years of the 20th century in Canada
Canada
1928 in North America